West End is a suburb of Timaru, in the South Canterbury area and Canterbury region of New Zealand's South Island. It is located west of the town centre.

The suburb contains a multi-sport stadium called Fraser Park, which was branded as Alpine Energy Stadium.

Demographics

Fraser Park had a population of 2,751 at the 2018 New Zealand census, an increase of 66 people (2.5%) since the 2013 census, and an increase of 72 people (2.7%) since the 2006 census. There were 1,179 households. There were 1,335 males and 1,419 females, giving a sex ratio of 0.94 males per female. The median age was 43.1 years (compared with 37.4 years nationally), with 474 people (17.2%) aged under 15 years, 525 (19.1%) aged 15 to 29, 1,167 (42.4%) aged 30 to 64, and 588 (21.4%) aged 65 or older.

Ethnicities were 90.1% European/Pākehā, 9.6% Māori, 2.5% Pacific peoples, 4.7% Asian, and 1.9% other ethnicities (totals add to more than 100% since people could identify with multiple ethnicities).

The proportion of people born overseas was 13.5%, compared with 27.1% nationally.

Although some people objected to giving their religion, 50.2% had no religion, 38.5% were Christian, 0.8% were Hindu, 0.3% were Buddhist and 2.1% had other religions.

Of those at least 15 years old, 294 (12.9%) people had a bachelor or higher degree, and 564 (24.8%) people had no formal qualifications. The median income was $30,500, compared with $31,800 nationally. 297 people (13.0%) earned over $70,000 compared to 17.2% nationally. The employment status of those at least 15 was that 1,146 (50.3%) people were employed full-time, 348 (15.3%) were part-time, and 51 (2.2%) were unemployed.

Education

Timaru Girls' High School started on the same site, separated by a fence.

Timaru West opened in 1913 as a side school for Timaru Main and became a separate school in 1923.

References

Suburbs of Timaru
Populated places in Canterbury, New Zealand